The following Union Army units and commanders fought in the Battle of Raymond of the American Civil War. The Confederate order of battle is listed separately.

Abbreviations used

Military rank
 MG = Major General
 BG = Brigadier General
 Col = Colonel
 Ltc = Lieutenant Colonel
 Maj = Major
 Cpt = Captain
 Lt = 1st Lieutenant

Other
 w = wounded
 k = killed

Union Forces

XVII Corps

MG James B. McPherson

See also

 Mississippi in the American Civil War

American Civil War orders of battle